Chester Harding (December 31, 1866 – November 11, 1936) was Governor of the Panama Canal Zone from 1917 to 1921.

Biography
Harding was born on December 31, 1866, in Enterprise, Mississippi. His father was a civil engineer and his older brother William P. G. Harding later became the second chair of the Federal Reserve.

His early education having been supplemented by training from his father at home, Chester Harding was able to complete the requirements for a Bachelors in Engineering from the University of Alabama in 1884 while only seventeen years old. He later graduated fourth in his class from the United States Military Academy at West Point in 1889. Harding was commissioned in the U.S. Army Corps of Engineers.

Harding taught civil and military engineering at West Point from August 1896 to February 1899. During the Spanish–American War, he was temporarily reassigned to the defense of Narragansett Bay in Rhode Island. Harding was promoted to major in June 1906. He taught civil engineering at the Army Engineer School from October 1906 to July 1907.

Harding was appointed Division Engineer of Gatun Locks Division in 1907. He was promoted to lieutenant colonel in February 1913. Harding served a term from 1913 to 1914 as one of the commissioners in charge of the District of Columbia.

Harding was appointed the Panama Canal maintenance engineer in January 1915. He then served as governor of Panama Canal Zone from January 1917 to March 1921. Harding was promoted to colonel in May 1917. He retired from active duty in the Army on March 31, 1920 and was advanced to brigadier general on the retired list the following day. Harding completed the last year of his gubernatorial term as a civilian.

During his later years, Harding lived in Vineyard Haven, Massachusetts. He took up portrait painting, which had been the profession of his grandfather Chester Harding, and received training at Boston and Paris from 1923 to 1927. Harding painted portraits of the first four Canal Zone governors: George Washington Goethals, Jay Johnson Morrow, Meriwether Lewis Walker and a self-portrait of himself.

Harding died on November 11, 1936, in Whitinsville, Massachusetts. He was interred at Arlington National Cemetery three days later.

References

External links
Panama Canal Authority biography

1866 births
1936 deaths
People from Clarke County, Mississippi
University of Alabama alumni
United States Military Academy alumni
Military personnel from Alabama
United States Army Corps of Engineers personnel
United States Military Academy faculty
American military personnel of the Spanish–American War
Members of the Board of Commissioners for the District of Columbia
Governors of the Panama Canal Zone
United States Army personnel of World War I
United States Army generals
People from Tisbury, Massachusetts
Burials at Arlington National Cemetery